Kaunas School of Arts was a public art school, which operated from 1922 to 1940 in Kaunas, Lithuania. At the time, it was the only operating art school in Lithuania.

References

Arts
Art schools in Lithuania
Educational institutions established in 1922
1922 establishments in Lithuania
1940 disestablishments in Lithuania
Educational institutions disestablished in 1940